The Melancholy Death of Oyster Boy & Other Stories is a 1997 poetry book written and illustrated by film director Tim Burton. The poems, which are full of black humor, tell stories of hybrid kids, spontaneous transformers, and women who have babies to win over men.

Some characters of the book would later appear in the flash animation series Stainboy, which was created, directed, and written by Burton.

Table of contents

Stick Boy and Match Girl in Love
Voodoo Girl
Robot Boy
Staring Girl
The Boy with Nails in His Eyes
The Girl with Many Eyes
Stain Boy
The Melancholy Death of Oyster Boy
Stain Boy's Special Christmas
The Girl Who Turned into a Bed
Roy, the Toxic Boy
James
Stick Boy's Festive Season
Brie Boy
Mummy Boy
Junk Girl
The Pin Cushion Queen
Melonhead
Sue
Jimmy, the Hideous Penguin Boy
Char Boy
Anchor Baby
Oyster Boy Steps Out

Origin of title poem
According to American comics artist and publisher Stephen R. Bissette, the title poem "The Melancholy Death of Oyster Boy" was originally conceived as a project for Bissette's comics anthology Taboo and was actually written by horror novelist Michael McDowell, who had previously worked with Burton on the screenplays for Beetlejuice and The Nightmare Before Christmas. McDowell is thanked in the acknowledgements at the end of the book, but is not credited for writing the poem.

Reception
The Melancholy Death of Oyster Boy & Other Stories has been generally well received by both critics and reader. It received 5 out of 5 stars at Amazon.com and a B+ at Entertainment Weekly.

References

External links
Full book online
StainBoy at AtomFilms

1997 poetry books
American poetry collections
Works by Tim Burton
Black comedy books